Luis F. Borromeo, also known as Borromeo Lou, was a Filipino jazz musician and entertainer. Known as the "King of Jazz" in the Philippines, Borromeo popularized the music genre of jazz in the Philippines. He is also noted for popularizing bodabil, a Filipinized variation of the Western performance of vaudeville. Borromeo reportedly coined the term himself from the Western counterpart of the art form, initially pronouncing bodabil as "vod-a-vil".

Biography
Borromeo is a native of Cebu coming from an affluent family. He first became involved in music in Leyte, where he had his early training in music and also went to the United States where he continued to pursue his studies in piano. In 1915, as an enthusiast in the performance arts, Borromeo went to attend the Pan-Pacific International Exposition in San Francisco to see stage shows and other performances. In one show, he was encourage by his fellow Filipinos to demonstrate his skills in playing the piano at the Dutch Pavilion. This led to him building a reputation as a musician.

The jazz pianist later secured a deal to perform at the Orpheum Circuit, an American theatre chain which staged live shows and featured films. For three years, he performed at Orpheum theaters under the stage name Borromeo Luo in various parts of the United States such as Chicago, New York, Portland, San Francisco, and Seattle often with singers and dancers.

He then became part of the D’avigneau's Celestials with Chinese Americans, Shun Tok Sethe and Men Toy. The trio performed jazz music in ethnic Chinese costume and was noted for their "oriental syncopation".

In 1921, he returned the Philippines to perform at the Manila Carnival and formed a classical jazz band. The genre was received well by the local entertainment industry which lead to the development of a performance art which would later be known as bodabil.

Borromeo also featured in the 1922 Manila Carnival where his own entertainment troupe, Borromeo Lou & Co., Ltd. which featured himself, acrobats, magicians, and other performers and musicians, featured in their own revue Borromeo Follies upon request of the fair committee.

After the carnival, the group went on to perform as the Borromeo Lou's Stadium Vod-a-Vil at the Olympic Stadium in Manila. Other similar groups were established by the mid-1920s. Borromeo also did performances in the provinces outside Manila. Bodabil remained prevalent throughout the rest of the American colonial period in the Philippines.

Not much is known about Borromeo's later life and his death since his death certificate in Cebu was lost during World War II. His children settled in the United States.

References

 
People from Cebu
Filipino jazz pianists
Filipino male musical theatre actors
Filipino jazz composers
Filipino expatriates in the United States
Vaudeville performers